Space Jam: A New Legacy (also known as Space Jam 2) is a 2021 American live-action/animated sports comedy film co-produced by Warner Animation Group, Proximity Media, and The SpringHill Company, and distributed by Warner Bros. Pictures. The film was directed by Malcolm D. Lee from a screenplay by Juel Taylor, Tony Rettenmaier, Keenan Coogler, Terence Nance, Jesse Gordon, and Celeste Ballard, and a story by Taylor, Rettenmaier, Coogler, and Nance. It serves as a standalone sequel to Space Jam (1996) and is the first theatrically released film to feature the Looney Tunes characters since Looney Tunes: Back in Action (2003). The film stars basketball player LeBron James as a fictional version of himself; Don Cheadle, Khris Davis, Sonequa Martin-Green and Cedric Joe star in live-action roles, while Jeff Bergman, Eric Bauza and Zendaya headline the Looney Tunes voice cast. The film follows James enlisting the Looney Tunes' aid to win a basketball game in a Warner Bros.-themed virtual multiverse against a rogue artificial intelligence's avatars after James's son is abducted by the AI.

Discussions for a Space Jam successor began following its release. Director Joe Pytka was attached to return in that capacity and Spike Brandt and Tony Cervone signed on as the animation directors; however, the project was stalled due to Michael Jordan's refusal to return. Several possible spin-offs focusing on other athletes, including Jeff Gordon, Tiger Woods, and Tony Hawk, were also discussed but never materialized. After several years in development, a LeBron James-led sequel was officially announced in 2014 with filming under Nance taking place from June to September 2019 around Los Angeles. After several weeks into filming, Nance left the project in July 2019 and was replaced by Lee.

Premiering in Los Angeles on July 12, Space Jam: A New Legacy was released nationwide in the United States by Warner Bros. Pictures on July 16, 2021, and through HBO Max for one month. The film was a box office disappointment, grossing $163 million worldwide against a production budget of $150 million, and received generally negative reviews from critics for its script, humor, runtime, and particularly for its extensive product placement of WarnerMedia properties. It won three of its four Golden Raspberry Award nominations, including Worst Actor for James.

Plot
In 1998, a young LeBron James is dropped off at a youth league basketball game by his mother. His friend Malik gives him a Game Boy, which LeBron plays with until Coach C demands him to concentrate on the game. After he misses a potential buzzer beater and is reprimanded by Coach C after the game, LeBron decides to follow his advice and discards the Game Boy.

In the present day, LeBron encourages his sons, Darius and Dominic, to pursue basketball careers. While LeBron's attempts with Darius are successful, Dom aspires to become a video game developer. LeBron, Malik, and Dom are later invited to Warner Bros. Studios to discuss a film deal. LeBron rejects the idea while Dom is interested in the studio's Warner 3000 software, particularly its AI, Al-G Rhythm. Their differing views lead to an argument as Dom reveals his resentment towards LeBron's advice. Having become self-aware and desiring more recognition in the world, Al-G lures LeBron and Dom to the basement server room and traps them in the Warner Bros. Serververse.

Al-G takes Dom prisoner and orders LeBron to form a basketball team to compete against his own, only earning his freedom if he wins, before sending him to Tune World. LeBron finds Tune World abandoned except for Bugs Bunny, who explains that Al-G persuaded the other Looney Tunes to leave their world and explore the Serververse. Using Marvin's spacecraft, the two travel to various worlds to locate and recruit the other Looney Tunes to form the Tune Squad. Meanwhile, Al-G manipulates Dom into allowing his help in upgrading himself and his game, which Al-G intends to use against LeBron.

In Tune World, despite Bugs' protests, LeBron insists on teaching the Tune Squad the fundamentals of basketball. They encounter Al-G's team, the Goon Squad, composed of avatars of basketball players and led by Dom. Al-G transforms Tune World to CGI, livestreams the game and abducts several viewers, including LeBron's family, into the Serververse, while various inhabitants arrive as spectators. Al-G threatens to delete the Looney Tunes and imprison the real-world spectators permanently if the Goon Squad wins.

The Goon Squad dominate the first half, using their upgrades to score extra points. LeBron realizes his mistake and allows the Looney Tunes to use their cartoon physics during the second half. During a time-out, LeBron apologizes to Dom for not listening to his ideas; Dom forgives LeBron and joins the Tune Squad. Al-G assumes control of the game and uses his abilities to substantially strengthen himself and the Goon Squad. Recalling a glitch in Dom's game, wherein a character is deleted and the game crashes after a specific move is performed, LeBron volunteers to perform the move, but Bugs does so at the last moment, sacrificing himself in the process. LeBron scores the winning point with Dom's help, deleting Al-G and the Goon Squad. The Looney Tunes and the Serververse are restored and LeBron, his family and the other real-world spectators are returned to their world as Bugs reconciles with his friends before being deleted.

One week later, LeBron, respecting Dom's wishes, allows him to attend the E3 Game Design Camp. He subsequently reunites with Bugs, who reveals that his cartoon physics allowed him to regenerate and that his friends have also entered the real world. LeBron, having accepted the Looney Tunes as his extended family, allows them to move in with him.

Cast

Live-action cast
 LeBron James as himself; James also voices his animated counterpart.
 Stephen Kankole as young LeBron James (13 years)
 Don Cheadle as Al-G Rhythm, a self-aware and deceitful AI who presides over the Warner Bros. Serververse. Cheadle also voices Al-G Rhythm's computerized form. Cheadle was a fan of Michael Jordan, the original film and the Looney Tunes cartoons, so he accepted the role once it was pitched to him.
 Cedric Joe as Dominic "Dom" James, LeBron's younger son and an aspiring video game developer. Dom is a fictionalized version of Bryce James.
 Sonequa Martin-Green as Kamiyah James, LeBron's wife. Kamiyah is a fictionalized version of Savannah James.
 Khris Davis as Malik, LeBron's childhood friend.
 Jalyn Hall as young Malik (13 years)
 Ceyair J. Wright as Darius James, LeBron's eldest son. Darius is a fictionalized version of Bronny James.
 Harper Leigh Alexander as Xosha James, LeBron's daughter. Xosha is a fictionalized version of Zhuri James.
 Ernie Johnson as himself, working as a commentator during the game between the Tune Squad and the Goon Squad.
 Lil Rel Howery as himself, working with Johnson in commentating on the game.

Xosha Roquemore appears as Shanice James, LeBron's mother and a fictionalized version of Gloria Marie James; Wood Harris appears as Coach C, LeBron's childhood coach; Sarah Silverman and Steven Yeun portray Warner Bros. executives; and Slink Johnson appears as a security guard. Basketball players Sue Bird, Draymond Green and A'ja Wilson cameo as themselves in a flashback in which Dom met them at a gathering attended by LeBron.

While Michael Jordan does not appear in the film, he is briefly seen on the Space Jam poster shown in Al-G Rhythm's Warner 3000 pitch. Michael B. Jordan cameos as himself, appearing as a visual gag where he is mistaken for Michael Jordan; this was teased by Cheadle prior to the film's release, who stated, "Michael Jordan is in the movie, but not in the way that you would expect it." Michael B. Jordan was invited to appear in the film when he visited the set and hung out with James. Lee was interested in having Michael Jordan appear in a post-credits scene in a reference to The Last Dance; however, the idea never materialized. Bill Murray, who appeared in the original film, makes a photographic cameo playing golf alongside Bugs Bunny in the credits. Travis Scott, "Rowdy" Ronda Rousey, and Naomi Osaka also appear in the end credits.

Appearances via archive footage include Mike Myers, Seth Green and Robert Wagner as Austin Powers, Dr. Evil, Scott Evil and Number Two, respectively from the Austin Powers franchise; Ingrid Bergman as Ilsa Lund from Casablanca; and Josh Helman as Slit from Mad Max: Fury Road.

Voice cast

 Jeff Bergman as Bugs Bunny, Sylvester the Cat, Yosemite Sam, Yogi Bear, and Fred Flintstone
 Eric Bauza as Daffy Duck, Porky Pig, Foghorn Leghorn, Elmer Fudd, and Marvin the Martian
 Zendaya as Lola Bunny; Zendaya accepted Coogler's offer to star in the film because of her interest in working with Coogler and being a fan of the original film, in addition to her family's history with basketball.
 Bob Bergen as Tweety; Bergen is the only voice actor from the first film to reprise his role.
 Candi Milo as Granny
 Gabriel Iglesias as Speedy Gonzales; Iglesias, a longtime fan of the character, expressed excitement at being cast as Speedy. When the crew asked him if he wanted to change Speedy's voice from the traditional delivery, Iglesias decided against it, saying, "When people think of Speedy Gonzales, I don't want them to think of me, I want them to think of Speedy Gonzales."
 Fred Tatasciore as Taz
 Jim Cummings provided additional uncredited vocal effects for Taz.
 Paul Julian as the Road Runner (archive recordings, uncredited)
 Anthony Davis as The Brow, a blue member of the Goon Squad and avatar of Davis with prehensile bald eagle-like wings instead of arms. The character is named after one of Davis's nicknames.
 Damian Lillard as Chronos, a gold robotic Goon Squad member and avatar of Lillard who can manipulate time. The character is inspired by Lillard's nickname "Dame Time".
 Klay Thompson as Wet-Fire, an elemental member of the Goon Squad and avatar of Thompson who possesses aquakinetic and pyrokinetic abilities in his two respective forms similar to Hydro-Man and Human Torch while also being able to combine those abilities like when he gave a fiery thumbs up in his water form. The character is inspired in part by the "Splash Brothers" nickname given to the duo of Thompson and Stephen Curry. The water powers represent his ability to shoot threes and the fire represents him going all out when he plays.
 Nneka Ogwumike as Arachnneka, a red and black member of the Goon Squad and avatar of Ogwumike with a spider-like appearance and abilities.
 Diana Taurasi as White Mamba, a Nāga-like member of the Goon Squad and avatar of Taurasi. The character is inspired by Taurasi's eponymous nickname.
 Rosario Dawson as Wonder Woman, a DC Comics superhero and Amazon who mentors Lola and oversees the latter's trial. Dawson reprises her role from the DC Animated Movie Universe.
 Justin Roiland as Rick Sanchez and Morty Smith, who experiment on Taz before returning him to Bugs.
 Kimberly Brooks as Additional Voices

In addition to voicing and providing motion capture for the Goon Squad, Davis, Lillard, Thompson, Ogwumike and Taurasi appear as themselves in live-action cameos when Dom meets them at a gathering attended by LeBron.

Looney Tunes characters who appear in non-speaking roles include Wile E. Coyote, Gossamer, K-9, Beaky Buzzard, Cecil Turtle, Charlie Dog, The Three Bears, The Crusher, Witch Hazel, Sam Sheepdog, Rocky and Mugsy, Playboy Penguin and Nasty Canasta. Penelope Pussycat was present in the film's merchandising and advertising as part of the Tune Squad, but did not appear in the film proper.

The Nerdlucks, the main antagonists of the original film, appear as spectators during the game via archive footage. James confirmed prior to its release that their Monstars forms would not appear in the film.

Warner Bros. references
As the Warner Bros. Serververse prominently features, the film incorporates numerous references to other Warner Bros. properties depicted as planets. Major properties directly named include Harry Potter, Game of Thrones, Mad Max, The Matrix, Casablanca, The Wizard of Oz, King Kong, The Iron Giant, Smallfoot, Rick and Morty, Austin Powers, Mortal Kombat, Hanna-Barbera, DC Universe, It, Charlie and the Chocolate Factory, Beetlejuice, Dunkirk, Gremlins, Animaniacs, A Clockwork Orange, and The Goonies. It also includes references to its standalone predecessor.

Production

Development
A sequel to Space Jam was planned as early as 1996, shortly after the original film was released in theaters worldwide. As development began, Space Jam 2 was going to involve a new basketball competition with Michael Jordan and the Looney Tunes and Berserk-O!, a new alien villain who was planned to be voiced by Mel Brooks. Artist Bob Camp was tasked with designing Berserk-O! and his henchmen, and with the proposed casting in mind, Camp designed Berserk-O! to resemble Brooks. Joe Pytka would have returned to direct and Spike Brandt and Tony Cervone signed on as the animation directors. However, Jordan did not agree to star in a sequel. According to Camp, a producer lied to the studio by claiming that Jordan had signed on in order to keep development going. Without Jordan involved with the project, Warner Bros. was uninterested and cancelled plans for Space Jam 2.

The potential sequel reentered development as Spy Jam and was to star Jackie Chan in a different script. The studio was also planning a film titled Race Jam which would have starred Jeff Gordon. Additionally, Pytka revealed that following the first film's success, he had been pitched a story for a sequel that would have starred professional golfer Tiger Woods, with Jordan in a smaller role. Pytka explained how the idea came from an out-of-studio script conference, with people who worked on the original film allegedly involved. Producer Ivan Reitman was reportedly in favor of a film which would again star Jordan. The follow-up films were ultimately cancelled in favor of Looney Tunes: Back in Action (2003), though Gordon did make a cameo in Back in Action. A film titled Skate Jam was in early development with Tony Hawk in the starring role. Plans were underway for production to begin immediately following the release of Looney Tunes: Back in Action, but were cancelled due to the poor financial performance of said film despite improved critical reception to Space Jam.

Resurgence
In February 2014, Warner Bros. officially announced that development of a sequel that would star LeBron James. Charlie Ebersol was set to produce, while Willie Ebersol wrote the script. That same month, James was quoted as saying, "I've always loved Space Jam. It was one of my favorite movies growing up. If I have the opportunity, it will be great." 

In July 2015, James and his film studio, SpringHill Entertainment, signed a deal with Warner Bros. for television, film and digital content after receiving positive reviews for his role in Trainwreck. 

By 2016, Justin Lin signed onto the project as director, and co-screenwriter with Andrew Dodge and Alfredo Botello. Professional player Kobe Bryant also expressed an interest in directing the film, though he was uninterested in a cameo appearance. By August 2018, Lin left the project and Terence Nance was hired to direct the film. 

In September 2018, Ryan Coogler was announced as a producer for the film. SpringHill Entertainment released a promotional teaser image officially announcing the film, with production set to begin in 2019 during the NBA off-season. Filming was to take place in California within a 30 mile radius of Los Angeles. 

By April 2019, Coogler and Sev Ohanian were rewriting the script. Final screenplay credit would ultimately go to Juel Taylor, Tony Rettenmaier, Keenan Coogler, Terance Nance, Jesse Gordon, and Celeste Ballard. Prior to production, the film received $21.8 million in tax credits as a result of a new tax incentive program from the state.

Filming
Principal photography began on June 25, 2019. On July 16, 2019, it was announced Nance was leaving the project because he and "the studio/producers had different takes on the creative vision for Space Jam 2", and that Malcolm D. Lee would serve as his replacement. Bradford Young, who was set to serve as cinematographer, also left the project and was replaced by Salvatore Totino.

Among locations used for filming included the Sheats–Goldstein Residence owned by James Goldstein, including turning its tennis court temporarily into a basketball court for the shooting. Production wrapped on September 16, 2019. The production spent at total of $194.7 million filming in California, receiving $21.8 million in tax rebates from the state. James held a farewell meeting talking about how he idolized with the first Space Jam film when he was a kid in Akron, Ohio, when the production wrapped, which was later leaked on August 16, 2020, along with pictures of James with his #6 Tune Squad outfit. A scene filmed under Nance's direction in June 2019 involving Pepé Le Pew attempting to flirt with a bartender (portrayed by Greice Santo), only to be rebuffed, was deleted. This decision was later met with backlash among many fans, who accused the studio of double standards by removing the character while allowing a cameo of Alex and his droogs, a gang that commits severe violence and sexual assaults in the 1971 film A Clockwork Orange, to be retained. Malcolm McDowell, who played Alex in the film, was asked permission to include a cameo appearance of his character and he granted it. The film's trailer revealed that Elmer Fudd and Yosemite Sam would be allowed to appear with their trademark guns in the film; since HBO Max's Looney Tunes Cartoons, a temporary ban had been enacted to not depict firearms due to mass shootings and gun violence in the United States.

In March 2020, photos taken on set and a brief recording of the wrap party were leaked online, revealing that the film would feature characters from other Warner-owned properties. In May 2020, James officially revealed the title and logo of the film, as Space Jam: A New Legacy. Don Cheadle stated that LeBron had an injury he suffered during production, while the filmmakers had a rigorous schedule and shot 14 hours a day.

Animation and visual effects
Both visual effects and computer animation for the Looney Tunes characters were provided by Lucasfilm's visual effects division, Industrial Light & Magic (ILM). This is the second collaboration with the Looney Tunes in using ILM for visual effects since Who Framed Roger Rabbit (1988). While the 2D animation was provided by Company 3 Animation, and Tonic DNA, who previously worked with Warner Brothers on Looney Tunes Cartoons. Additional CGI effects were also provided by Luma & Cinesite, who previously provided them in the first Space Jam.

In January 2020, veteran Walt Disney Animation Studios animators Mark Henn, Tony Bancroft, and the latter's brother Tom were hired by Warner Animation Group to work on the film. In March 2020, James announced that work on the film's animation had commenced, while also revealing that the production had largely been unaffected by the COVID-19 pandemic as most of the remaining work involved animation. That same month, Brandt was hired back on to the project as animation director while Cervone was also hired back on to work in the film's animation department. Director Malcolm D. Lee also learned a lot of experience working on animation from Spike Brandt, like harkening the Looney Tunes' designs back to the ones he remembered, and their animated expressions.

In July 2020, Dan Haskett, who has worked on the Looney Tunes since 1979, was hired to work in the animation department as well. Matt Williames, who had not worked with Warner Bros. since Looney Tunes: Back in Action, started doing animation for the film in August of the same year. In May 2020, Ole Loken, who worked extensively on animation hit Klaus, announced that he would serve as an animator on the film. By October, Loken shared the design for Lola Bunny and Daffy Duck online, revealing that A New Legacy would stay true to previous designs of the Looney Tunes characters. Despite this, Lola's final design was adjusted to be less openly sexualized than the first film, which caused controversy among fans of the original film. The film includes both traditional and CG animation, making it the first film from Warner Animation Group to incorporate the former, which was for the most part tradigitally created with Toon Boom's Harmony software.

Music

In January 2020, Hans Zimmer was announced as the composer for the film. By April of the same year, Kris Bowers was announced to be working with Zimmer as co-composers. However, in January 2021, it was officially confirmed that Bowers would receive solo credit. The soundtrack was released on July 9, 2021, and labeled by Republic Records and WaterTower Music featuring two lead singles: Lil Baby and Kirk Franklin's "We Win", and "Just for Me", by Saint Jhn featuring SZA. Other artists were also featured on the soundtrack, including John Legend, Lil Wayne, Saweetie, Jonas Brothers, 24kGoldn, Lil Uzi Vert, Chance the Rapper, Joyner Lucas, Big Freedia, G-Eazy, and Kash Doll. 2 Unlimited's "Get Ready for This", one of the songs from the first film, is briefly heard in one scene with Al-G and Dom. "Sirius", an instrumental song by Alan Parsons Project that serves as the entrance anthem for the Chicago Bulls, is heard briefly when Sylvester brings out Michael B. Jordan to the Tune Squad.

Marketing
The marketing campaign from Warner Bros. for Space Jam: A New Legacy began on July 31, 2020, when a hat with the film's logo became available on the studio's shop website. In August, it was announced that Moose Toys made a deal with Warner Bros. to make merchandise for the film along with the 2021 live-action/animated Tom and Jerry hybrid film.

On April 3, 2021, the first trailer was released, which revealed a number of references and characters who made cameos from franchises owned by Warner Bros. Jordan Hoffman from Vanity Fair compared the trailer to Disney's Tron franchise and fellow Warner Bros. film Ready Player One (2018). That same month, Hasbro also made a deal with Warner Bros. to make two Space Jam: A New Legacy versions of their board game properties Monopoly and Connect Four.

That May, Warner Bros. partnered with over 200 brands worldwide to promote Space Jam: A New Legacy. Other promotional partners included Kraft Heinz, General Mills, Funko, Hallmark Cards, GameStop, Mattel, and Spalding. On June 9, Nike and Converse revealed their tie-in merchandise for the film, which included numerous footwear and sportswear. The film is also set to debut the new LeBron 19 shoes. The following day, Warner Bros. released another trailer for the film took the same effect as the first one, in addition to showing more focus on the Goon Squad (composed of avatars of various famous NBA players such as Klay Thompson, Anthony Davis, Damian Lillard, Diana Taurasi, Nneka Ogwumike), and Zendaya as Lola Bunny. Brianna Zigler of Paste remarked "The film looks like it might be fun in a turn-your-brain-off-and-enter-the-void sort of way." On June 29, DC Comics released a graphic novel adaption of the film.

A tie-in video game, with ideas designed by Ricky of the United States and Narayan of India and developed by Digital Eclipse, was released on July 1, exclusively on the Xbox Game Pass Ultimate Perks program. That same month, McDonald's launched its limited time campaign in the participating restaurants by including twelve toys free with the purchase of a Happy Meal, while Warner Bros. collaborated with Nifty's to release a collection of 91,000 limited-edition NFTs featuring characters from the movie including Bugs Bunny, Tweety, Porky Pig and LeBron James. A large amount of NFTs are planned to be released to balance rarity with broad accessibility, driving "engagement around the film for as many Space Jam fans as possible".

The film was promoted with the third Teen Titans Go! movie, titled Teen Titans Go! See Space Jam, which aired on Cartoon Network on June 20, 2021.

Release

Theatrical and streaming
Space Jam: A New Legacy was theatrically released by Warner Bros. Pictures in the United States on July 16, 2021. It was also simultaneously released on HBO Max, available for subscribers of the ad-free plan to view at no extra cost for one month. The film premiered in Los Angeles on July 12, 2021. In September 2020, SpringHill Company signed a four-year contract with Universal Pictures, making this their fourth and final independent production.

Samba TV reported that 2.1 million U.S. households streamed the film in its opening weekend, one of the best totals for its AB Warner Bros./HBO Max day-in-date release, with Cleveland being the most-watched city. The film was watched in over 4.2 million U.S. households by the end of its first 30 days.

Home media
Warner Bros. Home Entertainment and Studio Distribution Services released Space Jam: A New Legacy on digital on September 3, 2021, and on Ultra HD Blu-ray, Blu-ray, and DVD on October 5.

Reception

Box office
Space Jam: A New Legacy grossed $70.6 million in the United States and Canada, and $93.1 million in other territories, for a worldwide total of $163.7 million.

In the United States, exit polling showed extensive diverse attraction across a variety of audiences; African Americans making up 36%, Caucasian 32%, Latino 23%, and Asian 9%, with a total of 48% being under the age of 17. Space Jam: A New Legacy was released with Escape Room: Tournament of Champions and limited expansion of Pig on July 16, 2021. It made $13.1 million on its first day. The film debuted earning $31.1 million from 3,965 theaters, the best opening weekend for a family film and the second highest for a Warner Bros. film of the COVID-19 pandemic behind Godzilla vs. Kong ($31.6 million), and besting the original ($27.5 million without inflation). Its second weekend earnings dropped by 69% to $9.5 million; the steep decline was blamed in-part on the film's simultaneous digital release on HBO Max. It earned another $4.2 million on its third weekend.

Critical response
 

On review aggregator website Rotten Tomatoes, the film holds an approval rating of 26% based on 226 reviews with an average rating of 4.40/10. The website's critical consensus reads, "Despite LeBron James' best efforts to make a winning team out of the Tune Squad, Space Jam: A New Legacy trades the zany, meta-humor of its predecessor for a shameless and tired exercise in IP-driven branding." At Metacritic, it was assigned a weighted average score of 36 out of 100 based on 46 critics, indicating "generally unfavorable reviews". According to Screen Rant writer Jordan Williams, the majority of critical reviews targeted the film's "lack of fun humor and earnest light-heartedness, overt promotion of Warner Bros. property, disappointment with celebrity and NBA roles, and the long two-hour runtime compared to [the first] Space Jams 87 minutes". Audiences polled by CinemaScore gave the film an average grade of "A−" on an A+ to F scale, the same as the first film, while PostTrak reported 78% of filmgoers gave it a positive score, with 58% saying they would definitely recommend it.

The A.V. Club A.A. Dowd gave it a "C−", stating that the film's comprehensiveness did "nothing", although it made misdirections which was subject to "glittering CGI trash heap of cameos, pat life lessons, and stale internet catchphrases." Writing for the South China Morning Post, James Marsh gave the film 1 out of 5 stars and criticized its use of product placement, which he felt neglected both supporters of the NBA and Looney Tunes. Calling it a "supposed family comedy...woefully devoid of laughs," Marsh concluded that it fell just short of "asking audiences point blank to subscribe to HBO Max," and was ultimately "a vacuous and cynical experience that shoots far wide of the mark." In her 2.5 out of 5 star review, Wenlei Ma of News.com.au criticized the film for overtly promoting Warner Bros. IPs, saying: "It's a shame that the cross-promotion was so nauseating and over-the-top because otherwise Space Jam: A New Legacy has a lot of value. It's more entertaining and better paced than the original, the character designs for the opposing team are impressive and it's even used the Looney Tunes characters in a way that stays true to their legacy while also introducing them to a new generation of kids." Alonso Duralde of TheWrap said that the film "barely has jokes for the Looney Tunes, let alone the entire Warner Bros. cast of characters" and wrote: "Viewers who, for whatever reason, love the first Space Jam may well find themselves delighted all over again, but as a once-in-a-lifetime opportunity to plunge a beloved sports figure into a century's worth of pop culture iconography, A New Legacy is a big fat airball."

Hagan Osborne of FilmInk was more positive about the film, writing: "What is most thrilling about A New Legacy is the liveliness of the worlds created, with each destination carrying with it a varying style of animation that brings with it added freshness." Amy Nicholson of Variety said, "Space Jam: A New Legacy is chaotic, rainbow sprinkle-colored nonsense that, unlike the original, manages to hold together as a movie." Kristen Page-Kirby, writing for The Washington Post, gave the film a score of 2 stars out of 4, saying: "There's no real reason for this sequel/tribute to the original 1996 film to exist, but now that it does, there's no reason to wish that it didn't", and added that the film "has just enough momentum, heart and spirit, even as it does both way too much and not quite enough ... If this is corporate synergy fired up to a terrifying new level, there's still enough heart at the movie's center to keep it from becoming all business." Korey Coleman and Martin Thomas of Double Toasted, the former of whom worked as an animator on the original Space Jam, both gave it a positive review. While they admitted that the film felt like an advertisement for HBO Max, they praised the creative use of the characters and the acting, though they took ire with some of the outdated references. Keith Hawkes of Parent Previews criticized the film, saying: "I think I'd rather watch an actual dumpster fire, stench and all. At least the fire wouldn't be trying to advertise, and it would probably have the common courtesy not to take the two hours this movie brutally extracted from my life. In case you're still on the fence, I've seen over 400 films for this job. This is easily one of the worst."

Brian Lowry of CNN wrote: "The first Space Jam was hardly a classic, which should temper expectations. Yet even by that standard, this marketing-driven exercise too often plays like the Acme version of it." Simran Hans of The Guardian gave a 2 out of 5 stars and wrote: "The sequel, on the other hand, seems to earnestly revel in the recyclable potential of the WB archive. Its elastic, mile-a-minute animated sequences insert Lola Bunny (Zendaya; wasted) into the world of Wonder Woman and send Tweety and Granny into The Matrix. James's natural charisma should allow the film to soar but he's bogged down by an avalanche of distracting cameos, from Gremlins to Game of Thrones." Mary Sollosi of Entertainment Weekly give a film a D+ grade and saying: "Here's the thing about basketball: It is extremely watchable. Here's the thing about Space Jam: A New Legacy: It's not."

Joe Pytka, the director of the original Space Jam, expressed his hatred towards the film upon its release. Among his complaints, Pytka compared LeBron James to Michael Jordan, who was arguably the most famous celebrity when the first film was released in comparison to James, criticized the story for not tying up emotionally to LeBron's life, felt the first film's cast and soundtrack were superior to the ones of A New Legacy and saw Bugs Bunny's role in the film as "heartbreaking". Pytka had earlier criticized Warner Bros.' decision to make a Space Jam sequel in 2016 back when Justin Lin was attached to direct, dismissing the notion as "ridiculous" despite working with LeBron James and Steph Curry, feeling that neither of them was a "transcendent figure" like Jordan.

Accolades
At the 42nd Golden Raspberry Awards, Space Jam: A New Legacy received a nomination for Worst Picture; and won Worst Actor for James, Worst Screen Combo for James and "any Warner cartoon character (or Time-Warner product) he dribbles on", and Worst Prequel, Remake, Rip-off or Sequel. It was nominated for the Comedy Movie of 2021 at the 47th People's Choice Awards, and received awards for the Hollywood Professional Association Awards' Outstanding Sound – Theatrical Feature and the Alliance of Women Film Journalists' Time Waster Remake or Sequel Award. Two awards for the film were nominated at the 2022 Kids' Choice Awards included Favorite Movie and Favorite Movie Actor for James.

In popular culture
South Park co-creator Matt Stone revealed that if an episode was to be produced about the film industry's impact on American culture, "it would, for sure, be about Space Jam 2." The streaming films South Park: Post Covid and South Park: Post Covid: The Return of Covid depict the film as a principal cause for society's collapse during the COVID-19 pandemic.

Possible sequel
Lee has expressed interest in making a third Space Jam film with Dwayne Johnson as the lead and focusing on wrestling instead of basketball.

Notes

References

External links
 
  at warnerbros.com
 
 

2021 3D films
2021 comedy films
2021 animated films
2021 computer-animated films
2021 fantasy films
2021 science fiction films
2020s English-language films
3D animated films
American 3D films
American basketball films
American children's animated comic science fiction films
American children's animated science fantasy films
American computer-animated films
American crossover films
American fantasy comedy films
American films with live action and animation
American sequel films
American sports comedy films
African-American films
Animated crossover films
Animated films about robots
Animated films set in Los Angeles
Animated sports films
Animation based on real people
Basketball animation
Comedy crossover films
Films about father–son relationships
Films about animation
Films about video games
Films about virtual reality
Films about real people
Films directed by Malcolm D. Lee
Bugs Bunny films
Charlie Dog films
Daffy Duck films
Elmer Fudd films
Foghorn Leghorn films
Marvin the Martian films
Porky Pig films
Ralph Wolf and Sam Sheepdog films
Rocky and Mugsy films
Speedy Gonzales films
Sylvester the Cat films
Tasmanian Devil (Looney Tunes) films
Tweety films
Wile E. Coyote and the Road Runner films
Yosemite Sam films
Films impacted by the COVID-19 pandemic
Films scored by Kris Bowers
Films set in 1998
Films set in 2021
Films set in Burbank, California
Films set in Ohio
Films set in studio lots
Films shot in California
Films shot in Los Angeles
Golden Raspberry Award winning films
HBO Max films
IMAX films
LeBron James
Looney Tunes films
Space Jam
Self-reflexive films
Warner Animation Group films
Warner Bros. animated films
Warner Bros. Animation animated films
Warner Bros. films